Félix Sabal Lecco (1920 – 23 October 2010) was a teacher, politician and diplomat representing Cameroon.
His son, also called Félix Sabal Lecco, is a well-known drummer.
Two other sons, Armand and Roger both became bass players.

Early years

Sabal Lecco was born in 1920 in Lena, in the Eastern Region of Cameroun.
He attended primary school in Bertoua and Doumé, then went to the Yaoundé School of Administration, where he earned a diploma.
From 1938 to 1957 he worked in the Education Service as a teacher and chief of examinations.

Political career

Entering the government, Sabal Lecco was appointed deputy prefect and then prefect in Lom-et-Djerem at Batouri.
Later he was prefect of Moungo.
Between September 1965 and September 1969 Sabal Lecco was both Federal Inspector of Administration (e.g. Governor) for the Littoral Region and Prefect for the Wouri Division.
He then briefly held the position of Secretary of State for Rural Development in the East Cameroun government.

In June 1970 Sabal Lecco was appointed Federal Minister of Justice.  
He was Minister of Public Service from 1972 to 1974, when he was appointed chairman of the Economic and Social Council. 
In these positions, he was associated with the repressive government of Ahmadou Ahidjo.
For many years he was secretary of the Cameroon National Union (CNU), the single party in Cameroon.
He held the position of political secretary of the CNU until 1984.

Later career

Paul Biya succeeded Ahmadou Ahidjo as President in 1982.  There was an unsuccessful military coup attempt on 6 April 1984, and Biya promised that heads would roll.
On 24 May 1984, at the first meeting of the UNC central committee following the attempted putsch,
Sabal Lecco and Victor Ayissi Mvodo were dismissed from the UNC's Bureau politique.
In 1984 Sabal Lecco was named Ambassador to Italy.
Sabal Lecco later represented Cameroon as Ambassador to France.
On 21 June 1992 he was appointed the first president of the National Council of Communication by Paul Biya.
Félix Sabal Lecco died at the age of 91 on 23 October 2010 in Yaoundé after a protracted illness.

Bibliography

References
Citations

Sources

2010 deaths
1920 births
Cameroonian politicians
Cameroonian expatriates in France
Cameroonian diplomats
Cameroonian educators